Vicia sativa, known as the common vetch, garden vetch, tare or simply vetch, is a nitrogen-fixing leguminous plant in the family Fabaceae. It is likely native to North Africa, Western Asia and Europe, but is now naturalized in temperate and subtropical regions worldwide. Although considered a weed when found growing in a cultivated grainfield, this hardy plant is often grown as a green manure, livestock fodder or rotation crop.

Description
Vicia sativa is a sprawling annual herb, with hollow, four-sided, hairless to sparsely hairy stems which can reach two meters in maximum length.

Each compound leaf ends in a branched tendril.

The pea-like flowers occur in the leaf axils, solitary or in pairs. The flowers are mostly visited by bumblebees.

It contains 4–12 seeds.

Cultivation

However, when grown for seed, less seed should be used; otherwise the crop will be too thick, reducing flower and seed production. When meant for seed, sowing is done early in the planting season for good returns; but, when for green manure, any time in spring is suitable. Sometimes, a full crop can be obtained even when sown as late as summer, though sowing so late is not recommended.

After the seed is sown and the land carefully harrowed, a light roller ought to be drawn across, to smooth the surface and permit the scythe to work without interruption. Also, the field should be watched for several days to prevent pigeons from eating too much of the sown seed.

Horses thrive very well on common vetch, even better than on clover and rye grass; the same applies to fattening cattle, which feed faster on vetch than on most grasses or other edible plants. Danger often arises from livestock eating too much vetch, especially when podded; colics and other stomach disorders are apt to be produced by the excessive amounts devoured.

Cereal grains can be sown with vetch so it can use their stronger stems for support, attaching via tendrils. When grown with oats or other grasses, the vetch can grow upright; otherwise its weak stems may sprawl along the ground. Several cultivars are available for agricultural use, and as for some other legume crops, rhizobia can be added to the seed.

Pests that attack this crop include the powdery mildew fungus Erysiphe pisi, the pea aphid Acyrthosiphon pisum, the corn earworm (Heliothis zea), the fall armyworm (Spodoptera frugiperda), and spider mites of genus Tetranychus.

During the early 20th century, a mutant of the common vetch arose with lens-shaped seeds resembling those of the lentil, leading to vetch invasions of lentil fields. D. G. Rowlands showed in 1959 that this was due to a single recessive mutation. The transition from traditional winnowing to mechanised farming practices largely solved this problem.

Improved varieties of Vicia sativa developed by the National Vetch Breeding Program for Australian farmers include; Timok, Volga, Rasina and more recently Studenica. These varieties are mostly cultivated in Western Australia, South Australia and Victoria.

History
Common vetch has long been part of the human diet, as attested by carbonised remains found at early Neolithic sites in Syria, Turkey, Bulgaria, Hungary and Slovakia. It has also been reported from Predynastic sites of ancient Egypt, and several Bronze Age sites in Turkmenia and Slovakia. However, definite evidence for later vetch cultivation is available only for Roman times.

The "tare" referred to in some English translations of the Bible (as in the "Parable of the Tares") may be darnel ryegrass, Lolium temulentum.

Taxonomy
Vicia sativa was first described by Carl Linnaeus in his 1753 Species Plantarum. Since that time, a number of synonyms have published:

Vicia abyssinica Alef.
Vicia alba Moench
Vicia amphicarpa Dorthes
Vicia amphicarpa L.
Vicia angustifolia L.
Vicia angustifolia Reichard
Vicia bacla Moench
Vicia bobartii E. Forster
Vicia bobartii E.Forst.
Vicia bobartii Koch
Vicia canadensis Zuccagni
Vicia communis Rouy
Vicia consobrina Pomel
Vicia cordata Hoppe
Vicia cornigera Chaub.
Vicia cornigera St.-Amans
Vicia cosentini Guss.
Vicia cuneata Gren. & Godr.
Vicia cuneata Guss.
Vicia debilis Perez Lara
Vicia erythosperma Rchb.
Vicia glabra Schleich.
Vicia globosa Retz.
Vicia heterophylla C.Presl
Vicia incisa M.Bieb.
Vicia incisaeformis Stef.
Vicia intermedia Viv.
Vicia lanciformis Lange
Vicia lentisperma auctor ign.
Vicia leucosperma Moench
Vicia macrocarpa Bertol.
Vicia maculata C.Presl
Vicia maculata Rouy
Vicia melanosperma Rchb.
Vicia morisiana Boreau
Vicia nemoralis Boreau
Vicia nemoralis Ten.
Vicia notota Gilib.
Vicia pallida Baker
Vicia pilosa M.Bieb.
Vicia pimpinelloides Mauri
Vicia segetalis Thuill.
Vicia subterranea Dorthes
Vicia terana Losa
Vicia vulgaris Uspensky

There are at least four generally accepted subspecies:
 Vicia sativa subsp. cordata (Hoppe) Asch. & Graebn.
 Vicia sativa subsp. nigra (L.) Ehrh. – narrow-leaved vetch (= subsp. / var. angustifolia, subsp. consobrina, subsp. cordata (Hoppe) Batt., subsp. cuneata, subsp. heterophylla, var. minor, var. nigra)
 Vicia sativa subsp. sativa (= var. linearis, ssp. notata)
 Vicia sativa subsp. segetalis (Thuill.) Arcang. (sometimes included in subsp. nigra)

Genome 
The Vicia sativa karyotype consists of 5, 6 or 7 chromosomes, with six (n=6) being the most common and best described. Given the Vicia sativa's genome is relatively large genome size (1.75Gb) due to large amounts of repetitive DNA, sequencing the genome was challenging compared to other legumes such as Medicago truncatula or soybeans.

A high-quality chromosome level genome assembly was published in 2021 of variety Studencia (n=6), following a draft genome assembly of line KSR5 (n=7). Variety Studencia, is predicted to have 53,318 protein coding genes. Whole genome sequence comparisons showed that Vicia sativa is most closely related to pea.

A high-quality genome sequence facilitates the application of genome editing and genomic selection for healthy, higher yielding varieties.

References

External links

Jepson Manual Treatment
USDA Plants Profile

Washington Burke Museum
Photo gallery

sativa
Flora of Europe
Flora of Estonia
Flora of the United Kingdom
Nitrogen-fixing crops
Plants described in 1753
Taxa named by Carl Linnaeus